Sphingopyxis flavimaris is a bacterium. It is Gram-negative, motile, yellow-pigmented and slightly halophilic. Its type strain is SW-151T (=KCTC 12232T =DSM 16223T).

References

Further reading
D'Onofrio, Anthony, et al. "Siderophores from neighboring organisms promote the growth of uncultured bacteria." Chemistry & biology 17.3 (2010): 254–264.

External links 
LPSN

Sphingomonadales
Bacteria described in 2005